Sanaʽa British School is a British international school in Sanaʽa, Yemen. It serves ages 2–17 in Nursery through Year 11.

References

External links

 Sana'a British School

Educational institutions with year of establishment missing
International schools in Yemen
British international schools in Asia
Sanaa